Melmerby Beach Provincial Park is a provincial park located in Little Harbour, Nova Scotia, Canada.

General Information 
The sand barrier beach is approximately 2 km in length and connects Kings Head with Roy Island.

The provincial park was established on 26 July 1977.

The park takes its name from the sailing barque Melmerby, which was travelling from Quebec when it wrecked at the beach in 1890 with considerable loss of life. Before the sinking of the Melmerby, the beach was originally named King's Head Beach. Melmerby beach was one of 15 beaches that was first supervised by the Nova Scotia Lifeguard Service (NSLS). 

This Nova Scotian beach holds the true meaning of beauty. With its beautiful shoreline on the Northumberland Strait, this beach ranks number one when it comes to warmth and overall has great reviews on many vacation sites in Nova Scotia. Melmerby Beach Provincial Park contains a lifeguard service, toilets in the public facilities, boat launching, salt-rinse showers, and abundant parking which make this beach the most ideal destination.

News publications 
Melmerby beach has been frequently seen in the local New Glasgow newspaper.

November 2013: A large blue shark was seen washed up on the beach, this was confirmed through a scientist at the Bedford Institute of Oceanography. Although blue sharks are common in Canadian waters they are rarely seen in the gulf of St. Lawrence in November.

August 2015: The Melmerby was remembered this day through the erection of a plaque to allow people to know the history of the beach.

August 2015: Melmerby beach was in the news once again for the large bacterial presence of enterococci. Due to frequent visitors on the beach and in the water, it cause bacterial colonies to grow substantially. The status of the beach can be reached at www.nsls.ns.ca.

October 2017: A 22-inch long bone was discovered on the beach. It was unknown until a zoologist from the Museum of Natural History identified the bone as a cleithrum from a Bluefin tuna.

December 2017: An informal polar swim was scheduled on Melmerby where everyone is invited to take place as it is organized by the loval YMCA.

Navigator

External links 
Melmerby Beach-

Tag Archives- Melmerby Beach

References

 Nova Scotia Lifeguard Service- Melmerby Beach 
 Google Maps- Melmerby Beach Provincial Park 
 The News- The Melmerby will be remembered Sunday 
 The News- UPDATED: Shark found at Melmerby Beach 
 The News- Melmerby Beach reopens 
 The News- Mystery solved of bone found on Melmerby Beach 
 The News- Informal polar bear dip to take place at Melmerby Beach Monday 

Beaches of Nova Scotia
Provincial parks of Nova Scotia
Tourist attractions in Pictou County
Landforms of Pictou County